Zud is a massive dying of livestock due to impossibility of grazing in Asian steppe areas.

Zud may also refer to:
Zud Schammel (1910-1973), American football player
Bayt Zud, a village in Yemen

See also